The Juan Chavez House is a historic two-story terrone house in Albuquerque, New Mexico. It was built in 1914-1917 by Juan Chavez, a native of San Acacia, New Mexico who lived here with his wife Candelabria and their sons. Chavez worked for a liquor wholesaler. During prohibition, which lasted from 1920 to 1933, he stored bootlegged alcohol in the upstairs bedroom. In 1948, the house was purchased by Louis Gross and his wife, Leona.  He sold fruit, vegetables, and his own wine, made in Bernalillo, New Mexico. The house was later inherited by his son, Louis W. Gross. Wilhelmina (Billie) Gross, wife of Louis W. Gross, was instrumental in getting the house listed on the New Mexico State Register of Cultural Properties in 1983 and the National Register of Historic Places in 1984. The house was remodelled as a hair salon by Frank Vallejos in 1989.

References

Adobe buildings and structures in New Mexico
Houses completed in 1916
National Register of Historic Places in Albuquerque, New Mexico
1916 establishments in New Mexico
Houses in Albuquerque, New Mexico
Houses on the National Register of Historic Places in New Mexico
New Mexico State Register of Cultural Properties